= Salome Kurasbediani =

Georgian politician (born 1992)

Member of the Parliament of Georgia
- Incumbent
- Assumed office 4 April 2023

Personal details
- Born: 10 May 1992 (age 34)
- Party: Georgian Dream

Salome Kurasbediani (Georgian: სალომე ქურასბედიანი; born 5 October 1992) is a Georgian jurist and diplomat. She belonged to the Georgian Dream party and was a Member of the Parliament of Georgia from 2023 to 2025.

== Biography ==
Salome Kurasbediani was born on 5 October 1992. She graduated Université Toulouse Capitole with a degree in International Economic Law in 2020, and one in International and European law in 2017. In 2014 she graduated Tbilisi State University. She worked as a jurist for years. She became a Member of Parliament of Georgia since 4 April 2023, with party list of Georgian Dream, which is the ruling party in Georgia. In October 2024 she was appointed to be Georgia's official representative to ICAO and also as a diplomat in the embassy in Ottawa.
